The public spending on education in the 57 Organisation of Islamic Cooperation (OIC) countries is one of the lowest in the world.

Statistics

Public expenditure on education (% of GDP)

Scientifically productive countries

Most productive universities in OIC

Notes

See also 
 List of Organisation of Islamic Cooperation member states by population
 Economy of the Organisation of Islamic Cooperation
 Islamic Educational, Scientific and Cultural Organization

External links

Islamic Educational, Scientific and Cultural Organization
OIC Standing Committee on Scientific and Technological Cooperation

Organisation of Islamic Cooperation